This is a list of events in Scottish television from 1995.

Events

January
No events.

February
No events.

March
26 March – Debut of the detective series Hamish Macbeth.

April to July
No events.

August
27 August – Speaking at the Edinburgh Television Festival, Michael Mansfield, QC, one of Britain's leading barristers calls for television cameras to be admitted into English courts to help demystify the legal process and restore public confidence in it.

September
No events.

October
No events.

November
No events.

December
28 December – Pilot episode of McCallum starring John Hannah. The programme is watched by over ten million viewers. It returns for a full series in 1997.

Unknown
Gus Macdonald is appointed chairman of Scottish Television, while Andrew Flanagan is appointed chief executive.

Debuts

BBC
26 March – Hamish Macbeth (1995–1997)
4 May – Monty the Dog who wears glasses (1995)

ITV
13 April – The Baldy Man (1995–1998)
5 June – The Caribou Kitchen (1995–1996)
28 December – McCallum (1995–1998)

Television series
Scotsport (1957–2008)
Reporting Scotland (1968–1983; 1984–present)
Top Club (1971–1998)
Scotland Today (1972–2009)
Sportscene (1975–present)
The Beechgrove Garden (1978–present)
Grampian Today (1980–2009)
High Road (1980–2003)
Taggart (1983–2010)
Crossfire (1984–2004)
Wheel of Fortune (1988–2001)
Fun House (1989–1999)
Win, Lose or Draw (1990–2004)
Doctor Finlay (1993–1996)
Machair (1993–1999)
Speaking our Language (1993–1996)
Wolf It (1993–1996)
Hurricanes (1993–1997)
Telefios (1993–2000)
Only an Excuse? (1993–2020)

Ending this year
10 February – The High Life (1994–1995)
29 April What's Up Doc? (1992–1995)
Unknown – The Tales of Para Handy (1994–1995)
Unknown – The Magic House (1994–1995)

Deaths
21 March – Robert Urquhart, 74, actor

See also
1995 in Scotland

References

 
Television in Scotland by year
1990s in Scottish television